Yachting Union of Latvia is the national governing body for the sport of sailing in Latvia, recognised by the International Sailing Federation.  It was founded in 1926. Twenty six organizations (11 associations, 11 yacht clubs and four others) are members of the union.

Famous sailors

Olympic sailing

Yacht clubs

See also
 Latvian Sailing Association

References

External links
 

Latvia
Sailing
Sports organizations established in 1926
1926 establishments in Latvia